Flers-lez-Lille is a former commune in the Nord department in northern France, merged into Villeneuve-d'Ascq in 1970.

Heraldry

See also
Communes of the Nord department

References

Former communes of Nord (French department)
Villeneuve-d'Ascq